Cimarron County is the westernmost county in the U.S. state of Oklahoma. Its county seat is Boise City.  As of the 2020 census, its population was 2,296, making it the least-populous county in Oklahoma; and indeed, throughout most of its history, it has had both the smallest population and the lowest population density of any county in Oklahoma.  Located in the Oklahoma Panhandle, Cimarron County contains the only community in the state (Kenton) that observes the Mountain Time Zone. Black Mesa, the highest point in the state, is in the northwest corner of the county.   The Cimarron County community of Regnier has the distinction of being the driest spot in Oklahoma ranked by lowest annual average precipitation, at just 15.62 inches; but at the same time, Boise City is the snowiest location in Oklahoma ranked by highest annual average snowfall, at 31.6 inches.

History
Cimarron County was created at statehood in 1907. Before the Oklahoma Organic Act was passed in 1890, the area had belonged to what was known as "No-Man's Land", also referred to as the "Public Land Strip". This was a relatively lawless area, with no organized government, and several outlaws sought refuge within its borders. In 1890, the strip became known as Beaver County, Oklahoma Territory. Informally, it was known as the "Oklahoma Panhandle". Only two communities were in the strip. One, Carrizo (near present-day Kenton), had 83 residents in 1890, while the other, Mineral City, had 93 residents. Otherwise, the land was used primarily by sheepherders from New Mexico.

Several communities vied to become county seat after statehood: Boise City, Cimarron, Doby, Hurley, Willowbar, and Centerview. A county election in 1908 selected Boise City.

Railroads came late to this part of Oklahoma. The Elkhart and Santa Fe Railway built a line from Elkhart, Kansas, through Cimarron County in 1925. It completed the link into New Mexico in 1932. Service ended in 1942. The same company built a line from Colorado to Boise City in 1931 and extended it into Texas in 1937. This line still operates and in 2000 was part of the BNSF system.

Cimarron County was affected by the Dust Bowl and was the site of the iconic 1936 photo entitled Dust Bowl Cimarron County, Oklahoma.

Geography
It is the fourth-largest county in Oklahoma by area.

The northern part of the county is drained by the Cimarron River, which flows eastward, then turns north into Kansas. The southern part is drained by the Beaver River (sometimes also called the North Canadian River). The man-made Lake Carl Etling lies inside Black Mesa Park.

The Boise City Airport (FAA ID: 17K) is about 3 miles north of town.

Major highways

  U.S. Highway 56
  U.S. Highway 64
  U.S. Highway 287
  U.S. Highway 385
  U.S. Highway 412
  State Highway 3
  State Highway 171
  State Highway 325

Adjacent states and counties
Cimarron County is the only county in the United States that borders four states: Colorado, Kansas, New Mexico, and Texas. As a result, Cimarron County is the only county in the United States to border at least five counties from five different states (one from each of the four aforementioned states, plus one in Oklahoma and a second county in Texas).
 Baca County, Colorado  (north/Mountain Time border)
 Morton County, Kansas  (northeast)
 Texas County  (east)
 Dallam County, Texas  (south)
 Sherman County, Texas (southeast)
 Union County, New Mexico  (west/Mountain Time border)

National protected area
 Rita Blanca National Grassland (part)

Images

Demographics

As of the 2010 census,  2,475 people, 1,047 households, and 705 families were residing in the county.  The population density was 2 people per square mile (1/km2).  The 1,587 housing units averaged 1 per square mile (0/km2). The racial makeup of the county was 84.7% White, 0.2% African American, 0.8% Native American, 0.3% Asian, 12.1% from other races, and 1.8% from two or more races. Hispanics or Latinos of any race made up 20.8% (16.4% Mexican, 1.4% Spanish, 0.2% Salvadoran).

Of the 1,257 households,  31.30% had children under the age of 18 living with them, 60.40% were married couples living together, 6.00% had a female householder with no husband present, and 30.90% were not families. About 29.30% of all households were made up of individuals, and 15.50% had someone living alone who was 65 years of age or older.  The average household size was 2.47, and the average family size was 3.07.

In the county, the age distribution was 27.60% under  18, 6.40% from 18 to 24, 23.40% from 25 to 44, 24.00% from 45 to 64, and 18.60% who were 65 years of age or older.  The median age was 39 years. For every 100 females there were 97.40 males.  For every 100 females age 18 and over, there were 95.30 males.

The median income for a household in the county was $30,625, and for a family was $36,250. Males had a median income of $24,327 versus $18,110 for females. The per capita income for the county was $15,744.  About 13.90% of families and 17.60% of the population were below the poverty line, including 22.20% of those under age 18 and 10.10% of those age 65 or over.

Politics
Cimarron County is a solidly Republican county in presidential elections. It cast 92% of its votes for Donald Trump in the 2020 election, the highest percentage of any Oklahoma county. The last Democrat to carry the county was Jimmy Carter in 1976.  A section of U.S. Route 287 in Oklahoma within the county was renamed President Donald Trump Highway after Trump left office. The Oklahoman newspaper reported in December 2021: "After altering rules and overcoming opposition to pass the state's highway naming bill in May, Oklahoma GOP legislators have yet to provide promised funding for signage along a 20-mile stretch of Panhandle highway designated 'President Donald J. Trump Highway.'"

Economy
The county economy has been largely based on cattle ranching and agriculture throughout its history. Wheat and grain sorghum are the most important crops. The Dust Bowl devastated the county during the 1930s, and the deluges of 1942-1945 destroyed what was left; the economy had to be completely rebuilt. Oil and natural gas production became important in the 1960s, and a gas plant near Keyes began producing helium in 1959. In 2000, Cimarron County had the ninth-highest per capita income of all Oklahoma counties.

Communities

City
 Boise City (county seat)

Towns
 Kenton
 Keyes

Census-designated places
 Felt

Other unincorporated places
 Griggs
 Sturgis
 Wheeless
 Regnier

See also
 National Register of Historic Places listings in Cimarron County, Oklahoma
 Oklahoma Panhandle

References

Further reading
 , includes much about the history of Cimarron County in the 20th century.

External links

 NASA Earth Observatory article about Cimarron County
 Encyclopedia of Oklahoma History and Culture - Cimarron County
 Oklahoma Digital Maps: Digital Collections of Oklahoma and Indian Territory
 Cimarron  County Sheriff's Office

 
1907 establishments in Oklahoma
Populated places established in 1907
Oklahoma Panhandle